Xeniconeura is a genus of flies in the family Lauxaniidae. There is one described species in Xeniconeura, X. costalis.

Distribution
USA (Colorado), Mexico.

References

Lauxaniidae
Articles created by Qbugbot
Lauxanioidea genera
Diptera of North America